Cece is a village in Fejér county, Hungary.

Famous residents
 János Horváth (1921 - 2019), Hungarian economist, politician
 László Kovács (1933 – 2007), Hungarian cinematographer
 Gábor Varga (1968- ), Hungarian teacher, politician

External links

  in Hungarian
 Street map 

Populated places in Fejér County